The 1st Annual GMA Dove Awards were held on September 1969 during the National Quartet Convention in Memphis, Tennessee.

Award winners
Song of the Year
"Jesus Is Coming Soon"; R. E. Winsett; R. E. Winsett Music (SESAC)
Songwriter of the Year
Bill Gaither
Male Vocalist of the Year
James Blackwood
Female Vocalist of the Year
Vestal Goodman
Male Group of the Year
The Imperials
Mixed Group of the Year
The Speer Family
Album of the Year
"It's Happening"; Oak Ridge Boys; Bob MacKenzie; Heart Warming
Instrumentalist
Dwayne Friend
Album Jacket
"It's Happening"; Oak Ridge Boys; Heart Warming
Television Program
Gospel Jubilee, Florida Boys
D.J. of the Year
J. G. Whitfield

External links
 

GMA Dove Awards
1969 music awards
1969 in American music
1969 in Tennessee
GMA